Permana is an Indonesian surname. Notable people with the surname include:

 Dio Permana (born 1995), Indonesian football player
 Lenny Permana (born 1975), Indonesian badminton player

Indonesian-language surnames